The Kirat or Kirati people are indigenous ethnic groups of the Himalayas.

Kirat may also refer to:

 Kirat or Kiranti languages, the language of the Kirati
Kirat Mundhum, the religion of the Kirati
Kirat Autonomous State, an area of the Himalaya of ethnic Kirati people of Nepal in the eastern region
Kirata, term in Sanskrit literature and Hindu mythology for various peoples who had territory in the mountains
Kirata Kingdom, in Sanskrit literature and Hindu mythology refers to any kingdom of the Kirata people, who were dwellers mostly in the Himalayas
Kirātārjunīya, epic poem in Sanskrit by Bhāravi
Kirat (unit), 1/24 of a feddan, an Arabic unit of area
Kirat Karo, the principle of honest living, a pillar of Sikhism

People
 Bhatt Kirat, Sikh Brahmin bard in the court of Guru Arjan
 Kirat Babani (born 1922), Indian writer, journalist and progressive activist of Sindhi language and nation
 Kirat Bhattal (born 1985), Indian actress 
 Kirat Singh (c. 1763–1835), the last Jat ruler of Gohad state in Madhya Pradesh, India (1803–1805)

See also